Prathyaksha Raksha Daiva Sabha (PRDS) is an Indian religion based on the teachings of Poykayil Sreekumara Gurudevan. The expression "Prathyaksha Raksha Daiva", means "The God that redeems in person". It is also deemed to consider as a religious protest movement in connection with the Kerala renaissance. It was founded in 1909 by Poykayil Sreekumara Gurudevan at Eraviperoor of Thiruvalla Taluk, in Kerala, India.

Administration 
PRDS has most of its followers from Kerala, and a few from Tamil Nadu and Karnataka. It has hundreds of branches, worship centres and educational institutions and also owns land across Kerala.  The administration charge of all these factions is resided at the head office situated at Eraviperoor. It has a constitution; the leaders are elected democratically for a period of 3 years. The key positions of PRDS Administration are: President, Vice President, General Secretary, Joint Secretary and Treasurer.

Traditional Faith and A Myth 
Tradition says that God who has forgotten His own People was merciful and promised to come to emancipate them. The story told by the elders, believed by them, and reaffirmed by generations is that the orphans who lost their parents used to cry relentlessly incessantly throughout the day and night and it continued for generations, years. They were victims and prey for cruel animals. Those who survived were faced with utter starvation. They ate what they found around them. They slept under the trees and their tears had never dried up. God, the Merciful was benevolent. He was moved by the tears of the orphans and God came down to them in the form of a she falcon (Chakkiparunthu a common friendly bird) The falcon bird is familiar to them and they were not afraid of it. In the night the bird spread its long wings, protected them, and spoke to them in a language known to them and promised them that on one day their Mother and Father will come to them. It was this message that has come true. Sreekumara Gurudevan combined in Him the Father and Mother that were lost for them forever and the address by his followers as "Appachan" is something more than the father and mother. Every incarnation of God is prophesied by great men. The Avatar is a pre-destined event in the endless process of time. The traditional story of the she-falcon bird is yet another indication and symbol that signaled the Avatar of Gurudevan a God that has promised to come.

Faith 
Having experienced the fact that Gurudevan was the ever-expected God that redeemed and appeared to save them from the bondage of slavery, a large number of Deliths followed him forgetting their centuries-old caste distinction and untouchability among them. At each stage, they tried to understand and meticulously watched whether this was the same God that had promised to come and closely scrutinized whether the new Upadeshi (Preacher) (Paster) combined in him the long lost "Mother" and the long lost "Father" in Him. They were satisfied, convinced, and certain that this man was short and black. Attractive and Majestic appeared in the shape of their grandparents, with very many familiar features were None-else but their God "Appacchen! Now the Deliths followed and crowded around Him in thousands and He realized that it was time to reveal his new message to this masses because they have come out of their old religions, they have given up their old caste, difference and they have started to adopt a new behavioral pattern of the brothers and sisters and children of the same parents. This new set of people was really astonished to hear the affectionate calling and addressing of them as "Makkal" My own children" by the new God. It was my first experience that they were being greeted as one's own. "Child". It was the first feeling that they have got someone to look after them. It was the beginning of the feeling of security in the hands of someone. At last, they have found out their Real Savior, Gurudevan, their affectionate "Father".

Nature of PRDS 
The religion he found was simple, transparent, and based on historical Truth. Gurudevan asked his followers to abandon their old-order of faith whatever it be and to believe Him as the only God for them. There were no sacred books, no ritualities, practices, no priestly classes. His words were the scriptures. He saved them and promised them all sorts of protection in Him, and called his people as Rakshikkapettavar (The protected people For an ordinary man the concept of God is protection from all possible dangers, illness, and death, from fear and misery. He promised all these and they felt and experienced it in plenty. They saw their Lord as the burning sun on the top of Kulathur Kunnu None had illness till their Lord lived along with them. In the event of danger, in the event of illness, in the event of any other human misery, they went and prayed to him. He had the solution for that. When they prayed to remember Him even in his absence they were relieved of their danger. Thus they felt that it was their God, the God that appeared in human form, in the form and shape of their long-lost parents who came to end their slavery!

Legacy 
The followers, disciples, and early contemporaries of Gurudevan believed that He and His Sabha will be realized and made a reality in the world by the legacy and spiritual inheritance by Abhivandya Mathavu who led the Sabha for half a Century (46 years) immediately after Gurudevan Abandoned His earthly human life on the 29th of June 1939 on the early hours of Thursday. Abhivandya Mathavu continued the spiritual Legacy, as the only woman Head of a spiritual organization in the world. The Mother's attempt was immortalized and perfected and fulfilled by the Heavenly Acharyaguru and Vazchayin Adhipan.

Gurudevan bought approximately 125 acres of land in different parts of Travancore for the use of PRDS. There was 7.5 acres of land at Eraviperoor. 5.5 acres at Madappally, Changanacherry and 13.5 at Neyyattinkara in Trivandrum district.

References

Further reading 

V.V.Swamy and E.V.Anil, "Prathyaksha Raksha Daiva Sabha - Orma, Pattu, Charithrarekhakal",Adiyardeepam Publications,2010
 'Vyavastayude Nadapathakal',Society of PRDS Studies, Unseen letters,Slate Publications, 2017

Anti-caste movements
History of religion in India
Indian caste movements
1909 establishments in India
Indian religions
Indian religious leaders